This is the discography for American musician Matthew Koma.

Extended plays

Singles

As lead artist

As featured artist

Guest appearances

Songwriting credits

Notes

References 

Discographies of American artists
Hip hop discographies
Pop music discographies
Rock music discographies